Evenkia may refer to:
Evenk Autonomous Okrug, a former federal subject of Russia
Evenkiysky District, a district of Krasnoyarsk Krai, Russia

See also
 Evenki (disambiguation)